Football in Yorkshire refers to the sport of association football in relation to its participation and history within Yorkshire, England. The county is the largest in the United Kingdom and as thus has many football clubs professional and amateur.

Sheffield in South Yorkshire is recognised by FIFA and UEFA as the birthplace of club football, because Sheffield F.C. are the oldest association football club in the world.
 Hallam F.C. also from Sheffield are the second oldest. With its origins in the Sheffield Rules code, the game eventually spread to other parts of the county after Hull local Ebenezer Cobb Morley wrote The Football Association's Laws of the Game, which are still used worldwide today.

History

The county has a very long tradition in the sport; it is officially recognised by FIFA as being the birthplace of club football as the world's oldest club Sheffield F.C. was formed in Sheffield during 1857. Two men from Sheffield codified a set of rules for the game in 1857, these were known as the Sheffield rules and the Football Association rules which were created in 1863 were based in part on them. Ebenezer Cobb Morley was the first secretary of The Football Association, its second ever president and the man who drafted the FA's laws of the game at his home in Hull.

The world's first ever inter-club match took place on 26 December 1860 in Sheffield; the match was between Sheffield F.C. and a newly formed club named Hallam F.C.; Sheffield won 2–0. As Hallam were also from the city of Sheffield, this would also prove to be the world's first ever local derby in club football. Notably, Hallam's home ground Sandygate Road, at which they still play at today, was first opened in 1804 and is recognised by the Guinness Book of Records as the oldest ground in the world.

Domestic competitions

1860s to 1920s
 Herbert Chapman — played for many teams, but was most noted as a manager for Huddersfield Town and Arsenal winning the top honours in English football. He is credited with being one of the game's first modernisers, introducing new tactics and training regime; Chapman is also credited with the introduction of shirt numbers in the sport.
 Thomas Hogg and Chris Hogg — brothers from Skelton, Yorkshire introduced football to Argentina, they organised a meeting on 9 May 1867 where the oldest football club in Argentina was founded in the form of Buenos Aires Football Club.
 Joseph Whitaker — one of the key figures in the foundation of US Palermo, the second oldest football club in Sicily. His family were wealthy 19th-century tycoons from West Yorkshire, who moved to develop a wine industry in Sicily.
 Frank Womack — played for Birmingham City, he holds the all-time league appearances record for the club, turning out a total of 491 times.

1930s to 1970s
 Gordon Banks — from Sheffield, played club football largely at Leicester City and Stoke City. With England, he was part of the 1966 FIFA World Cup winning squad, he represented the country 73 times. Banks was elected in a poll by the IFFHS as the second best goalkeeper of the 20th century. He is also acknowledged by FIFA to have made one of the finest saves in the history of the World Cup, at the 1970 tournament, against Pelé of Brazil. He has been awarded an OBE for his contributions to sport.
 George Raynor — from Barnsley, transformed the Swedish national team into a powerful force in the late 1940s, and 1950s. He guided them to an Olympic gold in 1948 and a bronze medal in 1952. In the 1950 World Cup he guided them to 3rd place behind only Brazil and Uruguay, and in 1958 he led them to the final, losing again to Brazil. His remarkable achievements went largely unnoticed and unrecognised in his native England, although in continental Europe he enjoyed short spells as manager of clubs such as Lazio and Juventus.
 Bill Nicholson — from Scarborough, he guided Tottenham Hotspur to the double, the first club to do so in the 20th century. Under his management they also became the first English club to win a European trophy, the European Cup Winners Cup in 1963.
 Don Revie — from Middlesbrough, he had an influential career as both a player and manager. As a player, he became famous as one of the first deep-lying centre forwards of the English game in Manchester City's so-called Revie Plan. In management he transformed Leeds United from Second Division also-rans into one of the most feared club sides in Europe, in the late 1960s and early 1970s. His remarkable achievements with the club were recognised with three Manager of the Year awards, an OBE and the England manager's job, which he eventually left controversially to take up a role in the Middle East.
 Brian Clough — from Middlesbrough, he transformed Derby County from a struggling Second Division club, into first division title winners in 1971–72 Football League First Division, also reaching the European Cup semi-final under his guidance. He was successful again with another struggling Second Division club, Nottingham Forest, winning the first division title in 1978 and the European Cup successively in 1979, and 1980

Football clubs

Men's
The table below lists English football league system clubs in the top eight tiers located within Yorkshire's traditional borders: from the top division (the Premier League), down to the Northern Premier League.

Women's
 FA Women's Championship
 Sheffield United W.F.C.
 FA Women's National League North
 Huddersfield Town Women F.C.
 Hull City Ladies F.C.
 Middlesbrough W.F.C.
 Sheffield F.C. Ladies

See also

 Football in England
 Yorkshire football team

Notes